KMMS (1450 kHz) is an AM radio station licensed to serve Bozeman, Montana.  The station is owned by Townsquare Media, licensed to Townsquare License, LLC.  It airs a news/talk format.

All Townsquare Media Bozeman studios are located at 125 West Mendenhall Street, downtown Bozeman. The KMMS transmitter site is on East Griffin, north of Bozeman.

The station was assigned the KMMS call letters by the Federal Communications Commission on July 14, 1991.

Ownership
In February 2008, Colorado-based GAPWEST Broadcasting completed the acquisition of 57 radio stations in 13 markets in the Pacific Northwest-Rocky Mountain region from Clear Channel Communications.  The deal, valued at a reported $74 million, included six Bozeman stations, seven in Missoula and five in Billings. Other stations in the deal are located in Shelby, Montana, and in Casper and Cheyenne, Wyoming, plus Pocatello and Twin Falls, Idaho, and Yakima, Washington.  GapWest was folded into Townsquare Media on August 13, 2010.

References

External links

KMMS official website

FCC History Cards for KMMS

MMS
News and talk radio stations in the United States
Gallatin County, Montana
Radio stations established in 1939
1939 establishments in Montana
Townsquare Media radio stations